Limea is a genus of bivalves belonging to the family Limidae.

The genus has cosmopolitan distribution.

Species:

Lima claytonensis 
Lima margineplicata 
Limea alticosta 
Limea argentinae 
Limea australis 
Limea austrina 
Limea broccha 
Limea bronniana 
Limea chathamensis 
Limea clandestina 
Limea coani 
Limea crassa 
Limea crenocostata 
Limea delanouei 
Limea deliciosa 
Limea inconspicua 
Limea juglandula 
Limea kowiensis 
Limea lata 
Limea limopsis 
Limea lirata 
Limea millesquamata 
Limea murrayi 
Limea opulenta 
Limea parvula 
Limea pectinata 
Limea pygmaea 
Limea riparia 
Limea sarsii 
Limea solida 
Limea strigilata 
Limea tenuisculptata 
Limea torresiana 
Limea tosana 
Limea transenna

References

Limidae
Bivalve genera